Zarnow is a river of Mecklenburg-Vorpommern, Germany. It flows into the Warnow between Schwaan and Rostock.

See also
List of rivers of Mecklenburg-Vorpommern

Rivers of Mecklenburg-Western Pomerania
Rivers of Germany